The Tribune or Tribune is the name of various newspapers:

United States

Daily

California
Oakland Tribune
The Tribune (San Luis Obispo)
San Gabriel Valley Tribune

Indiana
Kokomo Tribune
Peru Tribune
The Tribune (Seymour)
South Bend Tribune
News and Tribune, New Albany, formerly called The Tribune

Iowa
Ames Tribune
Des Moines Tribune

Ohio
Coshocton Tribune
Ironton Tribune

Pennsylvania
The Meadville Tribune
Philadelphia Tribune

Other
The Albuquerque Tribune, New Mexico
Bismarck Tribune, North Dakota
Chicago Tribune, Illinois
Columbia Daily Tribune, Missouri, also called the Tribune
Grand Haven Tribune, Michigan
Great Bend Tribune, Kansas
Great Falls Tribune, Montana
Greeley Tribune, Colorado
Hastings Tribune, Nebraska
La Crosse Tribune, Wisconsin
The Salt Lake Tribune, Utah
The Tampa Tribune, Florida
Casper Tribune, Wyoming
Texas Tribune,  Texas
Duluth News Tribune, Newspaper in Duluth, Minnesota

East Valley Tribune
East Valley Tribune, serving the East Valley region of metropolitan Phoenix, Arizona was a merger of the following
Mesa Tribune
Gilbert Tribune

Weekly and semi-weekly
Phoenix Tribune, Arizona
The Tribune (Elkin, North Carolina)Bay City Tribune, TexasHillsboro Tribune, OregonThe Marquette Tribune, WisconsinNew Orleans Tribune, LouisianaPortland Tribune, OregonThe Pratt Tribune, KansasSavannah Tribune, Georgia

DefunctAltoona Tribune (1856-1957), PennsylvaniaDetroit Tribune (1849-1862), MichiganIllinois Tribune (1840–1841), Chicago, Illinois
 Los Angeles Tribune (1886–1890), published from 1886 to 1890 by Henry H. Boyce
 Los Angeles Tribune (1911–1918), published from 1911 to 1918 by Edwin T. Earl
 Los Angeles Tribune (1941–1960), published from 1941 to 1960 by Almena LomaxNew York Tribune (1841–1924), New YorkScranton Tribune, Pennsylvania (ceased publication in 2005)Topeka Tribune, pre-Civil War, Territorial KansasTulsa Tribune (1919–1992), Oklahoma
 Charlottesville-Albemarle Tribune (1954–1992), Virginia

Other countries
 Ordered by country first.Active
 The Tribune, Nassau, Bahamas—see List of newspapers in the Bahamas
 Bahrain Tribune, now Daily Tribune, Bahrain
 Dhaka Tribune, Bangladesh, an English-language daily newspaper
 A Tribuna, a Brazilian newspaper published in Santos, São Paulo
 Burundi Tribune, Bujumbura, Burundi
 Cameroon Tribune, a Cameroonian government-owned newspaper
 The Minnedosa Tribune, Manitoba, Canada, a weekly
 Guelph Tribune, Ontario, Canada
 McGill Tribune, a weekly student newspaper published by the Students' Society of McGill University in Montreal, Quebec, Canada
 The Tribune (Chandigarh), a daily newspaper published in Chandigarh, India
 Mumbai Tribune, Mumbai, India
 Assam Tribune, Assam, India
 Sunday Tribune, a weekly newspaper published in Dublin, Ireland
 Connacht Tribune, a weekly newspaper published in Galway, Ireland
 Madagascar Tribune, a daily newspaper published in Antananarivo, Madagascar
 Tribune, monthly magazine of the Dutch Socialist Party (Netherlands)
 Nigerian Tribune, published in Ibadan, Nigeria
 Saipan Tribune, Northern Mariana Islands
 Qatar Tribune, Qatar
 Tribuna, a newspaper published in Russia
 Tribune de Genève, a newspaper published in Geneva, Switzerland
 Harare Tribune, an online daily newspaper published in Zimbabwe

Defunct
 Tribune (Australian newspaper), the former newspaper of the Communist Party of Australia
 The Tribune (Melbourne), Catholic weekly in Australia
 Winnipeg Tribune (1890–1980), Winnipeg, Manitoba, Canada
 Sarawak Tribune, (1945-2006), a newspaper published in Sarawak, Malaysia
 Tribune (Liberal Party newspaper), official UK Liberal party newspaper

Other newspapers
(combined titles including the word Tribune)

USABallard News-Tribune, Seattle, Washington Journal Tribune, Biddeford, MaineMail Tribune, Medford, OregonThe News Tribune, Tacoma, WashingtonNew York Herald Tribune (1924–1966), New YorkNew York World Journal Tribune (1966–1967), New YorkPost-Tribune, northwest IndianaPittsburgh Tribune-Review, PennsylvaniaThe San Diego Union-Tribune, CaliforniaSarasota Herald-Tribune, FloridaStar Tribune, Minneapolis, Minnesota
The Times-Tribune (Corbin), Kentucky
The Times-Tribune (Scranton), PennsylvaniaWaco Tribune-Herald, TexasThe Tribune-Democrat, Johnstown, PennsylvaniaThe Tribune-Democrat (La Junta), Colorado

Other countries
Asian Tribune, an online publication based in Sweden
The Express Tribune, a daily English-language newspaper published in Karachi, Pakistan
International Herald Tribune, a daily English-language international newspaper headquartered in Paris, France
Islington Tribune, the independent London newspaper

See also
Daily Tribune (disambiguation)
Tribune (disambiguation)
Tribune (magazine), a weekly magazine (previously a newspaper) published in London, England
Mumbai Tribune, published in Mumbai,India.